Dienes may refer to:

 Dienes (surname), including a list of people with the name
 the plural of diene, a class of organic chemical compound
 Base ten blocks used in mathematics education, also known as Dienes blocks or simply dienes